Events from the year 1971 in South Korea.

Incumbents
President: Park Chung-hee 
Prime Minister: Chung Il-kwon (until 4 June), Kim Jong-pil (starting 4 June)

Events

 April 27 – Presidential election, Park Chung-hee reelected.
 December 25 – Daeyeonggak Hotel fire, according to official confirmed report, 164 fatalities in Jung-gu, Seoul.

Births

 January 30 - Lee Seo-jin, actor and television host
 January 31 - Lee Young-ae, actress
 April 5 - Kim Soo-nyung, archer
 August 27 - Kyung Lah, journalist
 September 10 - Yun Young-sook, archer
 October 18 - Yoo Sang-chul, football player and manager. (d. 2021)

See also
List of South Korean films of 1971
Years in Japan
Years in North Korea

References

 
South Korea
Years of the 20th century in South Korea
1970s in South Korea
South Korea